Kalupur Assembly constituency is one of the delimited constituencies of the Gujarat Legislative Assembly. It was delimited by Delimitation of Parliamentary & Assembly constituencies order - 2008.

Member of Legislative Assembly

References 

Gujarat Legislative Assembly